is a Japanese tarento and idol who was formerly a member of Sakura Gakuin. On March 31, 2019 she ended her contract with Amuse, Inc. She is nicknamed .

Biography
Kurosawa lived in Aichi Prefecture from two to seven years old. In 2009 she won the Ciao Girl 2009 Audition and debuted as a child actress. From April 2, 2012 to March 27, 2014 Kurosawa appeared in Dai! Tensai Terebi-kun as a "Terebi Senshi." From May 6, 2015 she became a member of Sakura Gakuin.

Filmography

Films

Dramas

Variety series

Other series

Advertisements

Bibliography

Magazines

References

External links
 

Japanese entertainers
Japanese idols
Japanese women singers
Sakura Gakuin members
2001 births
Living people
Singers from Tokyo
Amuse Inc. talents